Shinichi Watanabe (born 17 March 1977) is a Japanese snowboarder. He competed in the men's halfpipe event at the 1998 Winter Olympics.

References

1977 births
Living people
Japanese male snowboarders
Olympic snowboarders of Japan
Snowboarders at the 1998 Winter Olympics
Sportspeople from Sapporo